Badar uz Zaman (born 1940, Lahore, Pakistan) is a classical musician of Pakistan. He contributes to Pakistani Classical Music by promoting and re-interpreting compositions of the sub-continent's Muslim composers. Zaman performs with his brother, Ustad Qamar-uz-Zaman, carrying forward the Pakistan's own "Kasur Gharana" traditions of the art of Khayal music. Classical singers typically represent Indian Gharanas of Music.

Early life and education
Zaman comes from a wealthy family of Lahore cloth merchants. He was educated in Pakistan at the University of the Punjab, Lahore, getting top position earning a Bachelor's degree in Music, and M.A. in Political Science.

Career
Zaman started his music career in 1956. Pervaiz Shami introduced him to debut on Radio Pakistan. He served the Punjab Council of the Arts as Deputy Director Drama and Resident Director Faisalabad, Sargodha and D.G Khan Arts Councils. As of 2012 Zaman was attached as Associate Professor to the Music Department, University of the Punjab Lahore. He received music training from Ustad Faiz Ali (Gawaliyar), Ustad Iftikhar Ahmed Khan (Delhi), Ustad Chhotay Ghulam Ali Khan (Qasur) and Ustad Bhai Naseera (Punjab). In composing of film songs, he has been affiliated with the renowned Pakistani music director Nisar Bazmi for 18 years. He has been in music for about 56 years, singing Khayal, Thumris, Dadra, and Ghazal.

Zaman remains active as a music performer, particularly in partnership with his brother, Ustad Qamar-uz-Zaman. Described as the "more articulate of the two", Badar uz Zaman expressed views on topics including India-Pakistan cultural exchange, and the 2011 arrest of singer Rahat Fateh Ali Khan.

Books
Zaman has authored, translated, researched and edited several books on music, such as:
 Nawa-e-Mosiqi,
 Taal Sagar,
 Sada Rang,
 Tohfa-tul-hind,
 Ramoz-e-Sitar
 Punjab ki classiki moosiqi ko ataa Tappa
 Muarif-ul-Naghmaat (Part 1, Part 2 and part 3)
 Sada-e-Mausiqui

His books Nawa-e-Mosiqi, Taal Sagar and Sada Rang have been translated into Hindi, English and Gurmukhi and are being taught in Pakistani and Indian universities.

Awards
Zaman was awarded a number of honours/awards including:
 Graduate Award 1974–75 & 1975–76,
 PTV Best Classical Singer Award 1982,
 Ahang-e-Khusravi, KH.   Khurshid Anwer Award 1987,
 K.L.Saigol Award 1991,
 Aitaraf-e-Fun Award 1999.
 PBC National Excellence Award for Classical Singer 14 April 2001.
 Best Sufi Singer Award at Chandi Garh 2007.
 Sada-e-Sufi Award Ludhiana 2007.
 President of Pakistan Award for Pride of Performance (23 March 2006)
 Unique Award for Serving Punjabi Music 2013 (by Govt of Indian Punjab)
 Nazakat Salamat Award by Sham Churasi Circle and PNCA (2014)
 Muslim League Golden Jubilee Award for Best Services of Classical Music (19 March 1999)
 Aetraf-e-Fun Award in Recognition of 40 Years Music Services, Multan (26 March 2000)
 Aetraf-e-Husn-e-Karkardagi Award by Faran Homeopathic College and Sargodha Art Council (16 May 2015)
 Best Music Judge Award, Inter-Collegiate Music Competition (1964)
 Ameer Khushro Award in Pakistan Music Festival, Lahore (25 November 1979)
 Punjab Youth Academy, Faisalabad Best Light Singer Award	(1982)
 Gliders Best Composer Award, Faisalabad (1984)
 Pakistan Hilal-e-Ahmar Award (1985)
 Aahang-e-Khusrovi Khaja Khursheed Anwar Gold Medal for Best Classical Singer (1987)
 Awarded Gold Medal for the Best Services in the field of Classical Music (1990)
 Gold Medal Easter Music Festival, Lahore (10 April 1979)
 Best Classical Singer Award by Bishop of Pakistan, Jonathan Rehmat and Eugene John (2 April 2009)
 Ameer Khusro Award by Melody Festival (2012)
 Husn-e-Karkardagi Award (16 January 2005)
 Best Singer Award by IGM, Lahore (2002)
 Best Keertankar Award by Chief Adviser Shiromani Gurdwara Parbandhak Committee Balbeer Singh, Harbhajan Singh and Jaswant Singh	(16 May 2007)
 Sada-e-Sufi Award, Ludhiana (21 May 2007)

Dabistan-e-Khusru Badar uz Zaman Music School
A unique award for Badar uz Zaman is that Pakistan's first-ever music academy has been named after him. Describing him as a 'legendary musician' of the country, the Jadeed Foundation named their music school after him as a living legend.

Zaman's contributions toward the preservation and promotion of classical music in Pakistan and sole entity representing Kasur Gharana are recognised all over Indo-Pak subcontinent.

References

External links
 Ustad Badar uz Zaman website

1940 births
Living people
Pakistani classical singers
Pakistani musicians
 Recipients of the Pride of Performance
Punjabi people
Musicians from Lahore
Pakistani musicologists
Pakistani writers about music
University of the Punjab alumni
Pakistani male singers